Chairmen of the State Council of the Komi Republic

Chairman of the Supreme Council

Chairmen (speakers) of the State Council of the Komi Republic

Sources

Lists of legislative speakers in Russia
Chairmen